Prussia Township is one of seventeen townships in Adair County, Iowa, USA.  At the 2010 census, its population was 173.

History
Prussia Township was organized in 1870.

Geography
According to the USGS, it contains two cemeteries: Immanuel Lutheran and Prussia.

References

External links
 US-Counties.com
 City-Data.com

Townships in Adair County, Iowa
Townships in Iowa
1870 establishments in Iowa
Populated places established in 1870